The Sepotuba River is a river in the state of Mato Grosso in western Brazil. It flows through the mountainous Serra do Tapirapuã region and is a tributary of the Paraguay River.

Tributaries 
The Sepotuba River cuts through the Serra do Tapirapuã, a basaltic plateau with an average altitude of about 450 meters, until it reaches the lower altitudes of the Paraguay River. Its main tributaries are the Formoso and Juba rivers, but its tributaries also include smaller rivers:

 Rio Sepotubinha
 Rio das Tocas
 Rio Queima-Pé
 Rio Sapo
 Rio Jubinha

Its streams include:

 Ararão
 Estaca
 Tarumã
 Água Limpa
 Bezerro Vermelho

Tourism 
When flowing through the Serra Tapirapuã, the Sepotuba River creates many waterfalls and cachoeiras and rapids. Some of the most well known places are the Salto das Nuvens Waterfalls, with a height of 19 meters and a width of 100 meters, and the Salto Maciel Waterfalls, which forms a sequence of rapids.

See also

List of rivers of Mato Grosso
Tangará da Serra
Cândido Rondon

References
Brazilian Ministry of Transport

Rivers of Mato Grosso